John Baring may refer to:

Johann Baring (1697–1748), later anglicised to John Baring, German-British merchant
John Baring (1730–1816), MP for Exeter 1776–1802
John Baring, 2nd Baron Revelstoke (1863–1929), senior partner of Barings Bank
John Baring, 7th Baron Ashburton (1928–2020), British merchant banker and former chairman of BP

See also
Baring (disambiguation)